Sakari Tuomioja's cabinet was the 37th government of the Republic of Finland. The cabinet's time period was from November 17, 1953, to May 5, 1954. It was a caretaker government.

Tuomioja's cabinet lifted the regulation of several provisions in 1954, including coffee sales, which had been under regulation since 1939.
 

 

Tuomioja
1953 establishments in Finland
1954 disestablishments in Finland
Cabinets established in 1953
Cabinets disestablished in 1954